James Mason House and Farm is a historic home located at Hedgesville, Berkeley County, West Virginia. The two-story stone house was built about 1809, and is a four-bay limestone building with a gable roof measuring 24 feet wide by 22 feet deep.  A two-story, concrete block residential addition was completed about 1900.  Also on the property is a bank barn (c. 1890) and corn crib (c. 1890).

It was listed on the National Register of Historic Places in 2006.

References

Farms on the National Register of Historic Places in West Virginia
Houses completed in 1809
Houses in Berkeley County, West Virginia
Houses on the National Register of Historic Places in West Virginia
National Register of Historic Places in Berkeley County, West Virginia
Stone houses in West Virginia